The arrondissement of Besançon is an arrondissement of France in the Doubs department in the Bourgogne-Franche-Comté region. It has 254 communes.

Composition

The communes of the arrondissement of Besançon, and their INSEE codes, are:
 
 Abbans-Dessous (25001)
 Abbans-Dessus (25002)
 Abbenans (25003)
 Adam-lès-Passavant (25006)
 Aïssey (25009)
 Amagney (25014)
 Amancey (25015)
 Amathay-Vésigneux (25016)
 Amondans (25017)
 Arc-et-Senans (25021)
 Audeux (25030)
 Autechaux (25032)
 Les Auxons (25035)
 Avanne-Aveney (25036)
 Avilley (25038)
 Bartherans (25044)
 Battenans-les-Mines (25045)
 Baume-les-Dames (25047)
 Berthelange (25055)
 Besançon (25056)
 Beure (25058)
 Blarians (25065)
 Bolandoz (25070)
 Bonnal (25072)
 Bonnay (25073)
 Bouclans (25078)
 Boussières (25084)
 Braillans (25086)
 Breconchaux (25088)
 Brères (25090)
 La Bretenière (25092)
 Bretigney-Notre-Dame (25094)
 Buffard (25098)
 Burgille (25101)
 Busy (25103)
 By (25104)
 Byans-sur-Doubs (25105)
 Cademène (25106)
 Cendrey (25107)
 Cessey (25109)
 Chalèze (25111)
 Chalezeule (25112)
 Champagney (25115)
 Champlive (25116)
 Champoux (25117)
 Champvans-les-Moulins (25119)
 Chantrans (25120)
 Charnay (25126)
 Chassagne-Saint-Denis (25129)
 Châteauvieux-les-Fossés (25130)
 Châtillon-Guyotte (25132)
 Châtillon-le-Duc (25133)
 Chaucenne (25136)
 Chay (25143)
 Chemaudin et Vaux (25147)
 Chenecey-Buillon (25149)
 Chevigney-sur-l'Ognon (25150)
 La Chevillotte (25152)
 Chevroz (25153)
 Chouzelot (25154)
 Cléron (25155)
 Corcelle-Mieslot (25163)
 Corcelles-Ferrières (25162)
 Corcondray (25164)
 Côtebrune (25166)
 Courcelles (25171)
 Courchapon (25172)
 Crouzet-Migette (25180)
 Cubrial (25181)
 Cubry (25182)
 Cusance (25183)
 Cuse-et-Adrisans (25184)
 Cussey-sur-Lison (25185)
 Cussey-sur-l'Ognon (25186)
 Dammartin-les-Templiers (25189)
 Dannemarie-sur-Crète (25195)
 Deluz (25197)
 Déservillers (25199)
 Devecey (25200)
 Durnes (25208)
 Échay (25209)
 Échevannes (25211)
 École-Valentin (25212)
 L'Écouvotte (25215)
 Émagny (25217)
 Épeugney (25220)
 Esnans (25221)
 Éternoz (25223)
 Étrabonne (25225)
 Ferrières-les-Bois (25235)
 Fertans (25236)
 Flagey (25241)
 Flagey-Rigney (25242)
 Fontain (25245)
 Fontenelle-Montby (25247)
 Fontenotte (25249)
 Fourbanne (25251)
 Fourg (25253)
 Franey (25257)
 Franois (25258)
 Geneuille (25265)
 Gennes (25267)
 Germondans (25269)
 Gevresin (25270)
 Glamondans (25273)
 Gondenans-les-Moulins (25277)
 Gondenans-Montby (25276)
 Gonsans (25278)
 Gouhelans (25279)
 Goux-sous-Landet (25283)
 Grandfontaine (25287)
 Le Gratteris (25297)
 Grosbois (25298)
 Guillon-les-Bains (25299)
 Guyans-Durnes (25300)
 L'Hôpital-du-Grosbois (25305)
 Huanne-Montmartin (25310)
 Hyèvre-Magny (25312)
 Hyèvre-Paroisse (25313)
 Jallerange (25317)
 Laissey (25323)
 Lanans (25324)
 Lantenne-Vertière (25326)
 Larnod (25328)
 Lavans-Quingey (25330)
 Lavans-Vuillafans (25331)
 Lavernay (25332)
 Liesle (25336)
 Lizine (25338)
 Lods (25339)
 Lombard (25340)
 Lomont-sur-Crête (25341)
 Longeville (25346)
 Luxiol (25354)
 Malans (25359)
 Malbrans (25360)
 Mamirolle (25364)
 Marchaux-Chaudefontaine (25368)
 Mazerolles-le-Salin (25371)
 Mercey-le-Grand (25374)
 Mérey-Vieilley (25376)
 Mésandans (25377)
 Mesmay (25379)
 Miserey-Salines (25381)
 Moncey (25382)
 Moncley (25383)
 Mondon (25384)
 Montagney-Servigney (25385)
 Montfaucon (25395)
 Montferrand-le-Château (25397)
 Montgesoye (25400)
 Montivernage (25401)
 Montmahoux (25404)
 Montrond-le-Château (25406)
 Les Monts-Ronds (25375)
 Montussaint (25408)
 Morre (25410)
 Le Moutherot (25414)
 Mouthier-Haute-Pierre (25415)
 Myon (25416)
 Naisey-les-Granges (25417)
 Nancray (25418)
 Nans (25419)
 Nans-sous-Sainte-Anne (25420)
 Noironte (25427)
 Novillars (25429)
 Ollans (25430)
 Ornans (25434)
 Osse (25437)
 Osselle-Routelle (25438)
 Ougney-Douvot (25439)
 Palantine (25443)
 Palise (25444)
 Paroy (25445)
 Passavant (25446)
 Pelousey (25448)
 Pessans (25450)
 Pirey (25454)
 Placey (25455)
 Pont-les-Moulins (25465)
 Pouilley-Français (25466)
 Pouilley-les-Vignes (25467)
 Pouligney-Lusans (25468)
 Puessans (25472)
 Pugey (25473)
 Le Puy (25474)
 Quingey (25475)
 Rancenay (25477)
 Recologne (25482)
 Rennes-sur-Loue (25488)
 Reugney (25489)
 Rigney (25490)
 Rignosot (25491)
 Rillans (25492)
 Roche-lez-Beaupré (25495)
 Rognon (25498)
 Romain (25499)
 Ronchaux (25500)
 Roset-Fluans (25502)
 Rougemont (25505)
 Rougemontot (25506)
 Rouhe (25507)
 Roulans (25508)
 Ruffey-le-Château (25510)
 Rurey (25511)
 Sainte-Anne (25513)
 Saint-Hilaire (25518)
 Saint-Juan (25520)
 Saint-Vit (25527)
 Samson (25528)
 Saône (25532)
 Saraz, Doubs (25533)
 Saules (25535)
 Sauvagney (25536)
 Scey-Maisières (25537)
 Séchin (25538)
 Serre-les-Sapins (25542)
 Servin (25544)
 Silley-Amancey (25545)
 Silley-Bléfond (25546)
 Tallans (25556)
 Tallenay (25557)
 Tarcenay-Foucherans (25558)
 Thise (25560)
 Thoraise (25561)
 Thurey-le-Mont (25563)
 Torpes (25564)
 La Tour-de-Sçay (25566)
 Tournans (25567)
 Trépot (25569)
 Tressandans (25570)
 Trouvans (25572)
 Uzelle (25574)
 Vaire (25575)
 Le Val (25460)
 Val-de-Roulans (25579)
 Valleroy (25582)
 Vaudrivillers (25590)
 Velesmes-Essarts (25594)
 Venise (25598)
 Vennans (25599)
 Vergranne (25602)
 Verne (25604)
 La Vèze (25611)
 Vieilley (25612)
 Viéthorey (25613)
 Villars-Saint-Georges (25616)
 Villers-Buzon (25622)
 Villers-Grélot (25624)
 Villers-Saint-Martin (25626)
 Voillans (25629)
 Voires (25630)
 Vorges-les-Pins (25631)
 Vuillafans (25633)

History

The arrondissement of Besançon was created in 1800. In 2009 the two cantons of Pierrefontaine-les-Varans and Vercel-Villedieu-le-Camp that previously belonged to the arrondissement of Besançon were added to the arrondissement of Pontarlier.

As a result of the reorganisation of the cantons of France which came into effect in 2015, the borders of the cantons are no longer related to the borders of the arrondissements. The cantons of the arrondissement of Besançon were, as of January 2015:

 Amancey
 Audeux
 Baume-les-Dames
 Besançon-Est
 Besançon-Nord-Est
 Besançon-Nord-Ouest
 Besançon-Ouest
 Besançon-Planoise
 Besançon-Sud
 Boussières
 Marchaux
 Ornans
 Quingey
 Rougemont
 Roulans

References

Besancon